Dwaune Jones (born July 11, 1977) is a retired American football wide receiver who is currently the Assistant Director of College Scouting for the Atlanta Falcons.  While Jones never played in a regular season NFL game, he spent time in training camp with the Cleveland Browns, the Seattle Seahawks and the Houston Texans. In 2001, he played for the Berlin Thunder of NFL Europe. During that season, he caught two long touchdown passes in World Bowl IX for the eventual champion Berlin Thunder. He played college football at the University of Richmond.

Prior to taking his role with the Falcons, Jones had been a scout for the Baltimore Ravens and New Orleans Saints.

References

External links
 New Orleans Saints bio

1977 births
Living people
American expatriate sportspeople in Germany
American football wide receivers
Players of American football from Washington, D.C.
Richmond Spiders football players
Berlin Thunder players
Cologne Centurions (NFL Europe) coaches
New Orleans Saints scouts